Jaganur  is a village in the southern state of Karnataka, India. It is located in the Chikodi taluk of Belgaum district in Karnataka.

Demographics
 India census, Jaganur had a population of 5661 with 2915 males and 2746 females. PIN CODE -591305

See also
 Belgaum
 Districts of Karnataka

References

External links
 http://Belgaum.nic.in/

Villages in Belagavi district